Intuitive eating is a weight-neutral approach to diet in which a person eats in response to cues of hunger and satisfaction. Focusing on "weight control" is discouraged with this approach. Additionally, intuitive eating aims at changing users' views about what they know about diet (notably, canceling toxic diet culture), health, and wellness, looking at these elements through a more holistic approach. And, intuitive eating helps to create a positive attitude and relationship towards food, physical activity, and the body.

The term "intuitive eating," coined by registered dietitians Evelyn Tribole and Elyse Resch, first appeared in a 1990's peer reviewed journal article. In 2012, Tribole's and Resch's book "Intuitive Eating a Revolutionary Program that Works" was published, identifying the ten components of intuitive eating and displaying the scientific research that has been conducted on the diet as of far.

Characteristics 
Unlike most diets, intuitive eating does not try to ban or restrict certain foods, with its mindset being that food should not be looked at as “good or bad.” Practitioners are instead encouraged to listen to their body and eat what feels right for them.

According to Evelyn Tribole and Elyse Resch’s book “Intuitive Eating a Revolutionary Program that Works", intuitive eating follows 10 guidelines. These guidelines are to reject the diet mentality, honor your hunger, make peace with food, challenge to food police, feel your fullness, discover the satisfaction factor, cope with your emotions without using food, respect your body, exercise, and honor your health.

Research

Weight-Loss and chronic disease control 
Intuitive eating has been shown to be equally effective to diet intervention for short-term weight loss, and to decrease weight significantly more than in control groups that had no diet intervention. Long-term weight loss from intuitive eating might be possible, but this possibility is not yet well-studied.

Intuitive eating may be equally effective as a diabetes self-management education (DSME) and a lifestyle weight loss program, although further research is needed.

In overweight or obese pregnant women, intuitive eating can also help lower glucose levels.

Intuitive eating may help to lower cholesterol and fasting glucose levels, improving HbA1C levels, and lowering systolic and diastolic blood pressure.

Disordered eating 
It was found in another 2022 review that intuitive eating reduced disordered eating behaviors.

Body acceptance and emotions directed at food and diet 
A 2022 review found that intuitive eating helped to decrease dieting and concerns about weight.

A review found that intuitive eating correlated with self-esteem and self-compassion. 

Another review found that intuitive eating can lead to improved quality of life, body image, and body appreciation.

A 2019 study revealed that women who followed intuitive eating patterns were able to let go of the concept of "good" and "bad" foods that are commonly promoted by diet culture, allowing them to eat a more balanced, sustainable, and non-restrictive diet. 

Intuitive eating can improve self-esteem and body appreciation in women.

Drawbacks and limitations 
Intuitive eating has shown growth as a possible method for losing weight and yielding health benefits. However, researchers warn that there still is not enough sufficient researched evidence to support that intuitive eating can assist with weight loss long-term, or even maintain lost weight. Furthermore, doctors and registered dietitians warn that this 'non-diet' diet approach will yield different results for different people who choose to follow this method of eating- no two bodies are the same and will react the same to this diet.

Additionally, registered dietitians comment that those who have certain health conditions, may be prescribed by their doctor to follow a particular diet, eliminating the choice to follow an intuitive eating diet. Critics of the diet have also stated that because intuitive eating is so broad with no given diet plan/food restrictions, it can be hard for some, not knowing what to actually eat and how much to eat- it can be a steep learning curve to accurately respond to one's hunger and fullness cues.

See also 

 Health at Every Size
 Human nutrition
 Body positivity

References 

Diets
Eating behaviors of humans
Health movements
Pseudoscience